Ahmad Hakimipour (born 1963) is an Iranian reformist politician and former militant.

Hakimipour was born in Zanjan. He was a member of the 4th Islamic Consultative Assembly from the electorate of electoral district of Zanjan and Tarom and member of Islamic City Council of Tehran for first and fourth terms.

References

Living people
People from Zanjan, Iran
1963 births
Will of the Iranian Nation Party politicians
Deputies of Zanjan and Tarom
Members of the 4th Islamic Consultative Assembly
University of Tehran alumni
Assembly of the Forces of Imam's Line politicians
Secretaries-General of political parties in Iran
Tehran Councillors 2013–2017
Tehran Councillors 1999–2003